The Carmel transmitting station, located half a mile (0.8km) SSW of the village of  Carmel in Carmarthenshire, has been broadcasting terrestrial TV and radio services since the mid-1970s. The TV coverage area for the Carmel transmission station includes most of Carmarthenshire, the southern and eastern parts of Pembrokeshire; the southern fringes of Powys and Ceredigion; the northern part of Swansea. The Carmel signal is also receivable in parts of Neath Port Talbot, Bridgend and Rhondda Cynon Taff. Places as far away as Merthyr Tydfil and the north Devon coast are also able to receive signals from Carmel.

Carmel started to switch over to digital terrestrial TV broadcast services on 26 August 2009.

Services available

Analogue television

21 May 1973 - 1 November 1982
Carmel never did broadcast VHF television, and went live with the UK's three national UHF television services.

1 November 1982 - 15 November 1998
The UK's fourth national television service joined the set transmitted from the site. Being in Wales, the S4C variant was broadcast.

Analogue and digital television

15 November 1998 - 26 August 2009
The initial rollout of digital television in the UK involved radiating the signals at low power in between the existing analogue channels.

26 August 2009 - 23 September 2009
The UK's digital switchover commenced at this site. Analogue BBC2 Wales closed on channel 63 and HTV took over on that frequency for what would be its final 3 weeks of service, vacating channel 60 as it did so. The new BBC A multiplex started up at full power in 64-QAM mode on channel 60, and Mux 1 on channel 55 closed.

Digital television

23 September 2009 - present
All the analogue television services closed and the new digital multiplexes took over their frequencies (and two new ones) with name-changes, power increases and a shift to 64-QAM.

May 2013
As a side-effect of frequency-changes elsewhere in the region to do with clearance of the 800 MHz band for 4G mobile phone use, Carmel's "Arqiva B" multiplex will have to be moved from channel 61 to channel 49 and the "BBC A" multiplex will get a negative offset.

Analogue radio (VHF FM)

† Relays the signal from Kilvey Hill to cover Swansea

Digital radio (DAB)

References

External links
Pictures of Carmel transmitter masts on Geograph
Freeview transmission details
Carmel Transmitter at thebigtower.com

Transmitter sites in Wales